Proprioseiopsis amotus is a species of mite in the family Phytoseiidae.

References

amotus
Articles created by Qbugbot
Animals described in 1969